The 1974 French Grand Prix was a Formula One motor race held at Dijon on 7 July 1974. It was race 9 of 15 in both the 1974 World Championship of Drivers and the 1974 International Cup for Formula One Manufacturers.

The 80-lap race was won by Ronnie Peterson, driving a Lotus-Ford. Niki Lauda finished second in a Ferrari, having started from pole position, with teammate Clay Regazzoni third. Until the 2020 Sakhir Grand Prix, this was the only World Championship Grand Prix in which lap times of less than one minute were set, by 12 drivers during qualifying, including pole position starter Lauda.

Qualifying

Qualifying classification 

*Positions with a pink background indicate drivers that failed to qualify

Race

Race summary 
To honor the 80th birthday of the ACF, a parade of vintage cars was organized with a selection of great drivers from the 20s and 30s up to the present day. The race itself was largely uneventful. Tom Pryce put in a superb performance to be 3rd on the grid behind Ronnie Peterson and Niki Lauda. However, he was slow off the start and was hit by Carlos Reutemann, ending his race. James Hunt and Henri Pescarolo were also taken out in the ensuing accident. Lauda led convincingly from Peterson and Clay Regazzoni with Emerson Fittipaldi up to 4th by lap 15. Lauda dropped back with handling problems on lap 16, and was passed by Peterson, who led to the flag. He was followed by Lauda and Regazzoni, who came home 3rd despite vibration problems. Regazzoni had been challenged strongly by Fittipaldi, but just as the McLaren driver was preparing to pass, Fittipaldi's engine exploded, ending his race. Jody Scheckter was fourth, less than a second behind Regazzoni.

Classification

Championship standings after the race 

Drivers' Championship standings

Constructors' Championship standings

References

French Grand Prix
French Grand Prix
1974 in French motorsport